Kriengsak or Kriangsak is a Thai given name. Notable people with the name include:

Kriangsak Chamanan (1917–2003),  prime minister of Thailand from 1977 to 1980
Kriengsak Chareonwongsak, Thai scholar and politician
Kriengsak Kovitvanit (born 1949), Archbishop of Bangkok
Kriengsak Nukulsompratana (born 1948), Thai footballer
Kriengsak Varavudhi (born 1948), Thai cyclist
Kriengsak Vimolsate (born 1942), Thai footballer